Volleyball club Niš (Serbian: Odbojkaški klub Niš), is a professional volleyball team based in Niš, Serbia. It plays in the Serbian volley league.

History
Volleyball club Niš (OK Niš) is a successor team of a former volleyball club Student Niš. The club was founded on 24.06.1972. and during that time, the team was a competitor of lower Serbian leagues. Games and practices were conducted at the basketball club Radnički outdoor court, until 1973, when "22. December" Hall was opened.

In the season 1975-1976, volleyball club Niš (volleyball club Student, at the time) won title of 2nd league East champion, and played in promotion play-offs with the winner of the 2nd league South, Rabotnički Skopje. Student won that play-off game with 3-1, and was promoted into the 1st league of Yugoslavia. It was the club's biggest achievement until promotion to Wiener Staditsche Superliga in 2014-2015 season.

Club name was officially changed in 1997.

2015-2016 squad

External links
Club's web page: http://oknis.co.rs/

Serbian volleyball clubs
Sport in Niš
Volleyball clubs established in 1972